Sir Frank Beaumont Moulden (25 June 1876 – 8 April 1932) was a lawyer in South Australia who served as Lord Mayor of Adelaide 1919–1921.

History
Frank was born in Collett Lodge, Norwood, the second son of Beaumont Arnold Moulden (–1926) and his wife Anna Mary Moulden née Cramond (1851–1929).

He was educated at St. Peter's College, and graduated LLB at the University of Adelaide, being articled to the legal firm Moulden & Son founded by his grandfather Joseph Eldin Moulden (died 1891), and ultimately became a partner.

Moulden was elected a councillor to the Adelaide City Council 1904, became an alderman in 1913, and Lord Mayor from 1919 to 1921, during which period he hosted the Prince of Wales on his official visitor to Adelaide.

He was President of the local chapter of Alliance Française and in January 1919 succeeded J. W. Canaway (c. 1848–1923) as Consular Agent for France in South Australia.

He died at his home "Lordello", Brougham Place, North Adelaide after a long illness.

Recognition
He was knighted in January 1922 in the 1922 New Year Honours.
In June or July 1924 he was appointed officer of the Académie de la République française  in recognition of his services to the French government.
He was awarded a diploma of honor and bronze medal by the Ligue maritime et coloniale française.
In 1929 he was made an officer of the Order of the Hospital of St. John of Jerusalem.

Family
Sir Frank Beaumont Moulden (1876-1932) married Deborah Vernon Hackett of Western Australia in 1918. They had no children

John Eldin Collett "Jack" Moulden (born 1873) of London was a brother, and Margaret Minna Moulden (born 1879), married John Wheeley Lea in 1902, later to Garnet Wolseley Bennett (died 1951) of Woodend, Victoria, was a sister. Youngest brother Eldin Swanzy Moulden (1883–1919) was Chief Assistant Engineer of the Municipal Tramways Trust under W. G. T. Goodman, died of pneumonia.

References 

1876 births
1932 deaths
20th-century Australian lawyers
Mayors and Lord Mayors of Adelaide
Knights Bachelor